BT Sport Films are a series of feature-length sports documentary films airing on the British subscription sports channels BT Sport. While the majority of films are about football, other sports covered include rugby, cricket, boxing, UFC, judo, speedway and MotoGP.

Background

The initial run of seven films was conceived prior to the launch of BT Sport in 2013, with the first film being shown on the channel's third day on air. The commissioning editors for the series have been Jamie Hindhaugh, Barry Andrews, Sally Brown, Simon Green and Grant Best.

A number of the films have received a limited theatrical release, in which case BT Sport Films is usually credited as one of the production companies.

On most occasions, the first transmission of a film will be commercial-free, with versions including commercial breaks used for subsequent broadcasts. The films are shown on the BT Sport channels alongside documentaries from ESPN, including 30 for 30, Nine for IX, SEC Storied and Backstory, as well as official MotoGP films. In 2015, the channel also had a season of Warren Miller ski and snowboarding films.

List of films

Short films
Four half-hour films have been made under the BT Sport Films Shorts banner. These initial four films were made using unused material from State of Play.
 State of Play: The Player
 State of Play: The Manager
 State of Play: The Club
 State of Play: Society

BT Sport Films Club
In December 2020, nine short interstitials titled BT Sport Films Club were aired, featuring presenter Craig Doyle discussing the films Brothers in Football, The Crazy Gang, Greavsie, Cornered, Rocky and Wrighty, Team of the Eighties, No Hunger in Paradise, Shoulder to Shoulder and The Gaffer, promoting the availability of the films on demand.

Critical response

The series has had a generally good reception from critics.

The Daily Telegraph said that Rocky & Wrighty was "a fitting tribute to the much-loved [David] Rocastle", while the same newspaper described Golazzo: The Football Italia Story as a "terrific documentary" and "well worth a watch."

Shoulder to Shoulder attracted a "phenomenal response on social media" according to the Irish Mirror, with The Irish Times calling it a "compelling documentary."

On Brothers in Football, The Sportsman said "for any devoted football fanatic this is a must-watch". The Liverpool Echo said Two Tribes was "evocative, poignant and stirring", capturing "a remarkable snapshot in time."

References

Sports television in the United Kingdom
BT Sport
Documentary film series